Kim Tae-hyeon (Hanja:金太鉉; born 17 September 2000) is a South Korean footballer currently playing as a defender for Vegalta Sendai.

Career statistics

Club

Notes

Honours
South Korea U23
AFC U-23 Championship: 2020

References

External links
 

2000 births
Living people
South Korean footballers
South Korea youth international footballers
Association football defenders
K League 2 players
Ulsan Hyundai FC players
Daejeon Hana Citizen FC players
Seoul E-Land FC players
Vegalta Sendai players